The 2019 Boar's Head Resort Women's Open was a professional tennis tournament played on outdoor clay courts. It was the eighteenth edition of the tournament which was part of the 2019 ITF Women's World Tennis Tour. It took place in Charlottesville, Virginia, United States between 22 and 28 April 2019.

Singles main-draw entrants

Seeds

 1 Rankings are as of 15 April 2019.

Other entrants
The following players received wildcards into the singles main draw:
  Lorraine Guillermo
  Emma Navarro
  Natasha Subhash
  Taylor Townsend

The following player received entry using a protected ranking:
  Lucie Hradecká

The following player received entry using a junior exempt:
  Coco Gauff

The following players received entry from the qualifying draw:
  Emily Fanning
  Sanaz Marand
  Rasheeda McAdoo
  Abbie Myers
  Ingrid Neel
  Erin Routliffe

Champions

Singles

 Whitney Osuigwe def.  Madison Brengle, 6–4, 1–6, 6–3

Doubles

 Asia Muhammad /  Taylor Townsend def.  Lucie Hradecká /  Katarzyna Kawa, 4–6, 7–5, [10–3]

References

External links
 2019 Boar's Head Resort Women's Open at ITFtennis.com

2019 ITF Women's World Tennis Tour
2019 in American tennis
Tennis in Virginia